Laurent Jean-Marie Cabannes (raised in Béarn, born in Reims 6 February 1964) is a former French rugby union footballer. He played as a flanker.

Cabannes is usually considered one of the best French flankers of his generation. He played at Section Paloise, Racing Club de France, Western Province, in South Africa, and Harlequin F.C., in England. He won the title of French Champion with Racing Club de France, in 1990, and was runners-up, in 1987.

Though a victim of an auto accident in 1990, and missing many months of rugby as consequence, Cabannes ultimately had 49 caps for France, with 2 tries scored, 8 points in aggregate, from 1987 to 1997. He played 6 times at the Five Nations, in 1991, 1992, 1993, 1994, 1995 and 1996, being a member of the winning team in 1993. Cabannes played four matches at the 1991 Rugby World Cup, and five matches at the 1995 Rugby World Cup, where France reached the 3rd place.

References

External links
Laurent Cabannes International Games for France

1964 births
Living people
Sportspeople from Reims
French rugby union players
Rugby union flankers
Harlequin F.C. players
France international rugby union players
Richmond F.C. players
Section Paloise players
Racing 92 players
Western Province (rugby union) players
Expatriate rugby union players in England
French expatriate rugby union players
French expatriate sportspeople in England
French expatriate sportspeople in South Africa
Expatriate rugby union players in South Africa